Steele Justice is a 1987 film written and directed by Robert Boris and starring Martin Kove, Sela Ward, and Bernie Casey.

Taglines
"When the police needed someone to stop the Vietnamese Mafia, there was only one choice..."

"You don't recruit John Steele. You unleash him."

"The only law is the Black Tiger's. The only justice is John Steele's."

Plot
John Steele is a Vietnam Vet who had trouble adjusting to life after the war. He hasn't been able to hold on to a job which includes being a cop. When his best friend Lee, who also served with him in Vietnam and who also became a cop, was killed by some drug dealers he was investigating, Steele was able to save his daughter and saw one of the shooters. He later sees him and learns that he is the son of General Kwan, another person he served with in Vietnam who was running his own deals on the side, and who tried to kill Steele and Lee but Steele not only survived but thwarted his plan. Steele suspects Kwan is involved with Lee's death but unfortunately Kwan's a respected member of the community. Steele's former boss Bennett is not in a rush to find the killers cause investigation reveals that Lee may have been dirty which Steele knows is not true. Steele sets out to prove Lee's innocence and to get Kwan.

Principal cast
 Martin Kove as John Steele
 Sela Ward as Tracy
 Ronny Cox as Bennett
 Bernie Casey as Detective Tom Reese
 Joseph Campanella as Harry
 Jan Gan Boyd as Cami
 Shannon Tweed as Angela Spinelli
 Kevin Gage as Army Sergeant
 Sarah Douglas as Kay
 Soon-Tek Oh as General Bon Soong Kwan
 Irene Tsu as Xua Chan

Critical reception
Janet Maslin of The New York Times had disdain for the film:

References

External links 
 
 
 

1987 films
1987 action films
Atlantic Entertainment Group films
1980s English-language films
Films directed by Robert Boris